The Jordan's Point Historic District encompasses a collection of historic industrial resources at Jordan's Point Park in Lexington, Virginia.  The area, long a major local crossing point of the Maury River, was developed about 1800 by John Jordan and John Moorhead, who established a sawmill on the site.  In 1806 they dammed the river, and then built a cotton mill in 1808.  Of this and later industrial activity on the site, only foundation remnants and the millrace remain; surviving structures associated with the development include the miller's house (c. 1815), now a local museum, and a chapel built in 1874.

The district was listed on the National Register of Historic Places in 2016.

See also
National Register of Historic Places listings in Lexington, Virginia

References

Historic districts on the National Register of Historic Places in Virginia
Greek Revival architecture in Virginia
Queen Anne architecture in Virginia
Buildings and structures in Lexington, Virginia
National Register of Historic Places in Lexington, Virginia